Franklin G. Floete (May 30, 1887 – September 21, 1973) was an American businessman who served as the Assistant Secretary of Defense for Properties and Installations from 1953 to 1956 and as Administrator of the General Services Administration from 1956 to 1961. He was born on May 30, 1887, in Armour, South Dakota. He died on September 21, 1973, at his home in Palo Alto, California after a long illness.

References

1880s births
1973 deaths
Administrators of the General Services Administration
Eisenhower administration personnel